The 1938 Auckland City mayoral election was part of the New Zealand local elections held that same year. In 1938, elections were held for the Mayor of Auckland plus other local government positions including twenty-one city councillors. The polling was conducted using the standard first-past-the-post electoral method.

The election saw incumbent mayor Sir Ernest Davis re-elected, increasing his majority in the process. The Labour Party again stood councillor Joe Sayegh (who was only narrowly defeated by Davis in 1935) as their candidate.

Candidates
Citizens & Ratepayers
The incumbent mayor Sir Ernest Davis accepted the wishes of a deputation of citizens led by William R. Fee, the president of the Auckland Chamber of Commerce.

Labour
Two people were nominated for the Labour Party nomination to contest the mayoralty; the deputy mayor Bernard Martin and councillor Joe Sayegh (who stood for mayor in 1935). At a delegates meeting of the Auckland Labour Representation Committee Sayegh was selected as Labour's mayoral candidate.

Campaign
Prior to the election several long serving Labour members of the city council were unexpectedly denied re-nomination. Ted Phelan, Arthur Rosser and George Gordon Grant were de-selected in the party selection process. Rosser ran for re-election regardless as an independent, but was defeated. The following year he was expelled from the Labour Party for standing against official party candidates. The Citizens & Ratepayers regained their majority on the city council and Sir George Richardson was appointed deputy mayor. However, Richardson died a month later and was succeeded as deputy mayor by John Allum. Richardson's death triggered a by-election which saw his seat gained by Labour Party candidate Charles Bailey, a former councillor who had lost his seat.

Mayoralty results

Councillor results

 
 
 
 
 
 
 
 
 
 
 
 
 
 
 
 
 
 
 
 
 
 
 
 
 
 
 
 
 

 
 
 
 
 
 
 
 
 
 
 
 
 
 
 
 
 
 
 
 
 

Table footnotes:
<noinclude>

References

Mayoral elections in Auckland
1938 elections in New Zealand
Politics of the Auckland Region
1930s in Auckland